José Agustín Ramírez Altamirano (July 11, 1903 – September 12, 1957) was a Mexican composer, teacher, poet and troubadour.

References

Mexican musicians
1903 births
1957 deaths
Writers from Guerrero
Musicians from Guerrero